The following is an incomplete list of sports stadiums in Southeast Asia. They are ordered by their capacity, that is the maximum number of spectators the stadium can normally accommodate, therefore excluding temporary extra accommodations.

Capacity of 30,000 or more

Other Stadiums hosted main competitions

Under construction/renovation

The following is a list of Southeast Asia stadiums which are currently under construction.

See also

List of Asian stadiums by capacity
List of African stadiums by capacity
List of European stadiums by capacity
List of North American stadiums by capacity
List of Oceanian stadiums by capacity
List of South American stadiums by capacity
List of stadiums by capacity
List of football (soccer) stadiums by capacity
List of sporting venues with a highest attendance of 100,000 or more

References